Sinoalaria is a genus of spiders in the family Theridiosomatidae. It was first described in 2014 by Zhao & Li. , it contains 4 species from Laos and China.

References

Theridiosomatidae
Araneomorphae genera
Spiders of Asia